Paul Mann (December 2, 1913 – September 24, 1985) was a Canadian film and theater actor, as well as founder of the Paul Mann Actor's Workshop. His brother was the actor Larry D. Mann.

Biography
Mann was influential in developing the concept of Method acting in America. While many other Method advocates (including Lee Strasberg) shared their knowledge at the  Actors Studio, Mann taught his own classes at his Actor's Workshop, founded in 1953. Along with Lloyd Richards (a fellow Toronto native and chief assistant director of the school), Mann also managed to create a comfortable atmosphere for actors of all races. Alumni of his school include Ruby Dee, Billy Dee Williams, Ossie Davis, Sidney Poitier, Al Lewis, and Vic Morrow.

Mann's own acting career was based primarily in theatre, beginning when he was sixteen. His onscreen appearances were limited to an episode of the 1950s television serial Danger and two feature film roles. The first was that of merchant Aleko Sinnikoglou in America, America (1963) (directed by his friend Elia Kazan) and the last was the village butcher Lazar Wolf in the screen adaptation of Fiddler on the Roof (1971). He was nominated for the Golden Globe Award for Best Supporting Actor – Motion Picture for both films.

Mann also was professor of acting and director of the theater arts program at the University of Wisconsin-Green Bay. A year before his death, Mann was found liable in a civil suit brought in Manhattan by eight female former students accusing him of sexual abuse and harassment  and was ordered to pay them a total of $12,000.

Filmography

Theatre credits
In most recent order:
Danton's Death / [Revival, Play] / ? / Oct 21, 1965 - Nov 1965
Incident at Vichy / [Original, Play, Drama] / Marchand / Dec 3, 1964 - May 7, 1965
The Changeling / [Original, Play] / ? / Oct 29, 1964 - Dec 23, 1964
After The Fall / [Original, Play, Drama] / Quentin's Father; Jason Robards portrayed Quentin / Jan 23, 1964 - May 29, 1965
Too Late the Phalarope / [Original, Play] / Japie Grobler / Oct 11, 1956 - Nov 10, 1956
Flight Into Egypt / [Original, Play, Drama] / Freund / Mar 18, 1952 - Apr 19, 1952
Macbeth / [Revival, Play, Tragedy] / Menteith and Murderer / Mar 31, 1948 - Apr 24, 1948
Flight to the West / [Original, Play] / Thomas Hickey / Dec 30, 1940 - Apr 26, 1941
Johnny Johnson / [Original, Play, Play with music, Comedy] / German Priest and Orderly / Nov 19, 1936 - Jan 16, 1937
Bitter Oleander / [Original, Play, Drama] / as Second Man / Feb 11, 1935 - Mar 1935
Follow Thru / [Original, Musical, Comedy] / as Gentleman / Jan 9, 1929 - Dec 21, 1929

References

Bibliography
Goudsouzian, A. (2004). Sidney Poitier: Man, Actor, Icon, UNC Press,

External links

1913 births
1985 deaths
Canadian male film actors
Canadian male stage actors
Jewish Canadian male actors
Male actors from Toronto
20th-century Canadian male actors
Canadian expatriates in the United States